Nicholas Agamalis, better known as Nick Skitz (born 1968 in Sydney, Australia of Greek descent), is an Australian DJ and dance music producer. His career in dance music started in the early 1990s. Since 1995, his Skitzmix series of compilations have become well known in Australian dance circles for featuring remixes and megamixes of well-known dance songs and are the best selling DJ compilations in Australia.

Biography
Skitz began working for dance label Pro-DJ International in the early 1990s.

Once Pro-DJ folded, he became involved with the dance label Central Station Records, and began remixing tracks for the label's Australian and international artists. Remixes of the "X-Files Theme" (Triple X) and "Excalibur" (FCB, and later Skitz's own version) reached the Top 10 on the ARIA singles charts in Australia.

From 1996, Skitz has released assorted dance/pop compilations of the latest tracks at the time (also a promotion for the affiliated record company, Central Station).

Major charting success of Skitzmix came in late 2001, with Skitzmix 10 reaching #9 on the mainstream ARIA Albums Chart alongside artists like Creed, Shaggy and the Bridget Jones's Diary Soundtrack. During the late 1990s and through the 2000s, Skitz also featured on the Ministry of Sound label & Wild compilations.

Skitz's track "The Ultimate" reached #2 on the dance charts in the UK. His first pop hit "Slave to the Music" reached the top 20 in Australia in November 2003 and was a cover of an original song by Twenty 4 Seven.

In 2004, he collaborated with Tony Le Rhodes, who is his brother Tony Agamalis. He was the ex-drummer for the "Choirboys", which than linked up with Mark Gable, lead singer of Australian rock band The Choirboys to rework their 1987 Australian hit "Run to Paradise" as a dance track. The song, billed as "Nick Skitz vs. the Choirboys", debuted in the top 20 of the Australian pop charts in July 2004, and was the 17th biggest selling dance single of that year. The single also features a remix by Jason Nevins.

Since 2006, Skitz has released two rock compilations called Skitz Metal and Skitz Rocks featuring 1980s and 1990s rock originals like Slade's "Cum On Feel The Noize" and Scorpions' "Wind Of Change" and some dance remakes of glam rock hits. In July 2007, Skitz released a rock/dance version of David Lee Roth's 1980s hit "Just Like Paradise" which reached #58 on the ARIA Physical Sales Chart in Australia.

In October 2008, Skitzmix 30 was released through Central Station Records/Destra Entertainment. Also in 2008 Skitz released his second solo album Come Into My World which debuted at #21 on the ARIA Chart. The first single from the album was a collaboration with Melissa Tkautz – "I Want Your Love". This reached #8 on the ARIA Dance Chart.

In 2009 Central Station Records folded and Skitz started his own labels LNG Music and Homebrew Records.

July 2011 saw the release of Skitzmix 38, Skitzmix 39 was released in November. In February 2012, Skitzmix 40 was released. On 28 December 2012, the single "Again & Again" (Nick Skitz and Basslouder featuring Brooklyn Bounce) was released.

In 2013 Skitz released his third solo album Turn It Up. The single "Natural Born Hustla" a collaboration with Akon hit the top ten on the iTunes charts. Also from the album the single "You Got The Love" hit the top 40 US Dance Charts and also hitting #1 on the US Dance Radio Chart in 2013.

Skitz teamed up with Amba Shepherd to create "Get Your Gun" which hit the top 20 on the UK Club Charts.

In October 2013 Skitzmix 45 was released. Skitzmix is the longest running Club scene CD series in Australian music history.

On 11 September 2015, the 50th edition was released featuring 22 tracks and 7 megamixes mixed by Skitz himself or DJ Samus Jay. This release also marks 20 years of the Skitz franchise.

August 2017 saw the release of Skitzmix 90's Anthems, a two disc compilation of classic dance tracks from the 90's including an exclusive Skitz Megamix. 90's Anthems charted at #1 on the Australian dance charts for many days.

In May 2018 Skitzmix 54 was released, boasting two CD's of the latest hands up and club smashes including the infamous Skitz Megamix. Also hitting #1 on the Australian dance charts.

Later in 2018 Skitz started his third label Krankin' Music, a label dedicated to old school NRG music. On December 14 Classics V1 was released, including three classic Nick Skitz NRG tracks.

Albums

Charting singles

References

1969 births
Living people
Australian electronic musicians
Australian people of Greek descent